Dead Hand Control is the third studio album by Vampire Weekend bassist and American musician Chris Baio, who goes by the mononym Baio. It was released on January 29, 2021, by Glassnote Records.

Background
The album was recorded over an 18-month period at Gorillaz vocalist Damon Albarn's 13 Studios in London and C+C Music Factory in Los Angeles.

Release
On November 18, 2020, Baio announced the released of his third studio album, along with two singles: "Endless Me, Endlessly" and "What Do You Say When I’m Not There?"

On January 15, 2021, another two singles were released: "Dead Hand Control" and "Take It From Me".

Critical reception
Dead Hand Control was met with "generally favorable" reviews from critics. At Metacritic, which assigns a weighted average rating out of 100 to reviews from mainstream publications, this release received an average score of 69 based on 7 reviews. AnyDecentMusic? gave the release a 6.8 out of 10 based on 7 reviews.

In a review for AllMusic, Marcy Donelson wrote: "Unlike his previous albums, the play times on Dead Hand Control vary widely, with tracks sometimes transitioning into one another. It ultimately has the effect of a night out at the club or, more precisely, a series of 12" extended dance mixes à la the 1980s that are cued up among radio cuts." Ben Miles of Clash said "Dead Hand Control, leaves you feeling somewhat underwhelmed as you come to the end of the 42 minute run time. Perhaps the most dominating issue on this LP is that it seems to fall short of what it’s clear intention is. Baio has nailed his colours to the mast in terms of what he is attempting to do with this album; bringing disparate and disenchanted individuals together with tales of selflessness and an eclectic influence of genres."

Track listing

Personnel
Credits adapted from AllMusic.

Musicians
 Chris Baio − vocals, bass, guitar, piano
 George Hume – guitar
 Robby Sinclair – drums
 Ezra Koenig – backing vocals
 Greta Morgan – backing vocals
 Buzzy Lee – backing vocals

Production
 Chris Baio – engineer, producer
 Emily Lazar – mastering
 Lars Stalfors – mixing
 Jasmine Chen – engineer
 Chris Kasych – engineer
 John Foyle – engineer

References

External links
 
 

2021 albums
Glassnote Records albums